Scandia  is a genus of hydrozoans in the family Hebellidae. 

Species include:
Scandia corrugata Fraser, 1938
Scandia gigas (Pieper, 1884)
Scandia michaelsarsi (Leloup, 1935)
Scandia minor (Fraser, 1938)
Scandia mutabilis (Ritchie, 1907)
Scandia neglecta (Stechow, 1913)

References

Hebellidae
Hydrozoan genera